Speed of Darkness is the fifth studio album by the Irish-American Celtic punk band Flogging Molly, released on May 31, 2011. The album was recorded at Echo Mountain, an old church building turned recording studio in Asheville, North Carolina. The album was produced by Ryan Hewitt, who has worked with bands Red Hot Chili Peppers and The Avett Brothers. Speed of Darkness debuted at number nine on the Billboard 200 chart and number four on the Billboard Independent Chart. It is the band's last album with drummer George Schwindt.

The expression speed of darkness had appeared in a 1999 book mixing physics and fiction, named The Science of Discworld, written by Terry Pratchett, Ian Stewart and Jack Cohen. In a 2011 interview on BBC Radio 1, frontman Dave King explained that the title track and album title was taken from a quote of Dino Misetić, the artist who designed the album cover, which appeared in the book Sarajevo Marlboro. Dino, who grew up in the Balkans during the Balkan Wars, is quoted in the book, saying: "They taught us what the speed of light is, but nobody can teach you what the speed of darkness is."

Track listing

Reception
The album received generally positive reviews from music critics. Allmusic have the album a mostly positive review, commenting that "while Flogging Molly hasn’t done much to innovate on their sound over the past decade or so, it doesn’t feel like they have to." Spin's reception was more mixed, as they wrote that while "rabble-rousing frontman Dave King champions defiant hope amid crushing desperation" the "overly smooth production undercuts his righteous fury, suggesting the group harbors dreams of a Green Day-style commercial breakthrough."

Personnel 
Flogging Molly
Dave King – lead vocals, acoustic guitar, electric guitar, classical guitar, bodhran
Bridget Regan – violin, tin whistle, vocals (lead vocals on "A Prayer for Me in Silence")
Dennis Casey – electric guitar, six string acoustic guitar, twelve string acoustic guitar, vocals
Matt Hensley – piano accordion, button accordion, concertina, vocals
Nathen Maxwell – bass, vocals
Bob Schmidt – tenor banjo, five string banjo, bouzouki, mandolin, vocals
George Schwindt – drums, percussion

Additional musicians
Joe Kwon (The Avett Brothers) – cello on tracks 3, 5, 6, 9, 10, 11
Rich Wiley – trumpet on track 2
Ed Roth – piano on track 9
Evan Hill – gang vocals on track 10

Charts

References 

2011 albums
Flogging Molly albums
Albums recorded at Sonic Ranch